John Paul Jones was a state senator in Louisiana. He represented Bienville Parish from 1912 to 1916. He succeeded Rush Wimberly in the state senate. He lived in the Jones House. He was a Democrat. A. R. Johnson succeeded him.

References

Louisiana state senators
Year of birth missing
Year of death missing